is a live-action Japanese-American TV series. The third entry of the Super Sentai series franchise, Battle Fever J was a co-production of Toei Company and Marvel Comics. A total of 52 episodes aired on TV Asahi from February 3, 1979 to January 26, 1980, following J.A.K.Q. Dengekitai and was followed by Denshi Sentai Denjiman.

The team have codenames named for countries around the world, also respectively named in their theme song: Battle France, Battle Cossack (Soviet Union), Battle Kenya, Miss America (United States) and Battle Japan. It marks the first appearance of a Black Ranger in the franchise. It was also the first series in the Super Sentai franchise where the heroes must control giant robots to defeat a monster who itself has grown to a gigantic size. Toei's tokusatsu adaptation of Spider-Man was the first to introduce this format and was also the inspiration for this and the subsequent entries in the Super Sentai series. The series was also partially inspired by the Marvel Comics character Captain America.

Battle Fever J was the first series to use the term Super Sentai (unlike the previous two who were just called Sentai, without the “Super”) until Toei announced in 1995 that its predecessors Himitsu Sentai Gorenger and J.A.K.Q. Dengekitai were also part of the Super Sentai series, when Chouriki Sentai Ohranger was announced as the 19th Super Sentai team.

Plot
General Kurama assembles four young agents who had been dispatched around the world for training. They are joined by FBI investigator Diane Martin, whose father was murdered by Egos. The five don powered suits to become the Battle Fever team. The Battle Fever team's trump card is the Battle Fever Robo. Egos tries to stop the construction of the Robot, but the monsters they send to perform this task are defeated one by one by the Fever team. Egos then unleashes the "younger brother" of the Buffalo Monster, a giant robot replica of its "older brother". The Robot, fortunately, is finished in time. Aboard it, the Fever team defeats the Buffalo Monster and its successors. The Fever team never stops, even when it lost two of its members (the original Miss America and Battle Cossack). With new members, the team defeats Hedder, now the Hedder Monster, and breaks into Egos' headquarters, where they are fed into the Egos Monster Making Machine so that they may be used as material for a Battle Fever Monster. The team destroys the machine and slays the mysterious deity Satan Egos himself with the Lightning Sword Rocketter sword-throwing move.

Characters

Battle Fever Team
The titular Battle Fever Team is unique among Super Sentai shows in that, originally, they did not "transform" into their costumes (as in the previous two series, Gorenger and JAKQ), instead they resorted to an unseen costume change. In most episodes, however, the members yell "Fever!" and spin around to transform although in episode 24 it is revealed they can store their costumes in their Battleceivers.
   / : A former National Defense Ministry officer. He is good at judo and karate. He is armed with a spear. During the team's roll call, he performs a martial arts-inspired dance. 21 years after Battle Fever J ended, Battle Japan appeared as one of the 24 Red Rangers in Hyakujuu Sentai Gaoranger vs. Super Sentai, introduced by Liveman Red Falcon to inspire the current team.
   : Unofficially the first Orange Warrior moniker in Super Sentai history who wielded twin sais.
  (1-33): He was good at science as well as war. During the team's roll call, he performed a traditional Soviet dance. He was the original second in command of the team. In episode 33, he left the Big Baser without his Battle Cossack uniform and was fatally shot by a troop of Cutmen, attempting to save a little girl named Mayumi from Egos' forces. He loved to play Pachinko and enjoyed eating caviar.
  (33-52): A silent cowboy. A man of action, not words. A scientist who trained in the Defense Ministry along with Kensaku. He joined Battle Fever to avenge the death of his friend. Makoto is an expert marksman. He is a loner, preferring to go off by himself. Makoto plays a trumpet to distract Egos.
   / : He received his combat training while in France. He became the new second in command of the team after Kensaku's death. He is normally a beautician, a dandy and playboy. He enjoys eating escargot. He is armed with a rapier sword. During the team's roll call, he performs a flamenco dance.
   / : Unofficially the first Black Warrior in Super Sentai history. He received his combat training while in Kenya. He is a wild child who can talk to animals. He is armed with a whip. During the team's roll call, he performs a tribal dance. He eats just about anything. The smell of his cooking is not appreciated by the other team members. Shirou later appeared in Kaizoku Sentai Gokaiger. He is also thematically similar to the Marvel superhero Black Panther.
   : The pink-colored moniker who is armed with throwing knives. During the team's roll call, she performs a disco dance.
  (1-24): An FBI agent who joined the Fever team to avenge her father Bosner, who was slain by Egos. In episode 24, after she was wounded by the Dracula Monster, she returned to the United States. Diane has a sister named Catherine.
  (24-52): An FBI agent trained by Diane Martin's father. When Diane was injured, Maria took her place as Miss America and then stayed on permanently when Diane decided to return to the United States.

Gear
 : The Battle Fever Squad's communication device, in Episode 24 it is revealed that the Battle Fever suits can be stored inside.
 : The Battle Fever Squad's standard issue weapon. It transforms into the Battle Fever Squad's assigned weapons. Forms the  bazooka or boomerang.

Vehicles
 : Stock green Mazda RX-7 used by Battle Japan and Miss America.
 : The motorcycles used by the rest of the BFS. In episode 35, Miss America rode Battle France's motorcycle.

Mecha
 : The Battle Fever Squad's box-like undersea headquarters. It can move from place to place under the sea.
 : A submarine-like mecha carrier. Splits in half to launch the Battle Fever Robo and stores all of its weaponry.
 : Resembling a samurai, this the first mega-robot in Super Sentai history. It has a variety of weapons:
 : Samurai-type sword with scabbard. On the grip are the letters "ACFKJ" (America, Cossack, France, Kenya, Japan).
 : The Battle Fever Robo's primary finisher.
 : The auxiliary finisher using the robot's total energy. It was used to kill Hedder Monster.
 : The auxiliary finisher used to kill Satan Egos in the final battle.
 : The throwing daggers stored in sheaths attached to the robot's legs. It was used in the  attack.
 : The hatchet.
 : The chains stored in the robot's arms.
 : A spear.
 : A trident. It can be used in conjunction with either Chain Crusher.
 : A shakujo. It was used in Episode 24 to fight the Dracula Robot.
 : A defense tool. It can withstand 28,000 tons of pressure.
 : Knuckle dusters.
 : The robot can attack using its detached horns.
 : The cannons stored inside the robot's lower legs.

Allies
 : The chief of the special science office of the National Defense Ministry who established the Fever team. He is a master of traditional Japanese swordsmanship.
 : One of the operatives that runs Big Baser.
 : The other operative that runs Big Baser.
 : Keiko's little brother.
 : Tomoko's little sister. Was used by Egos in episode 27 to find Battle Fever's base.
 : Robot mynah bird built by Tetsuzan as a present. Often had insight into the situation. Revealed in episode 51 to have a freezing ray built in.

Society Egos
 is a religion of mad egocentrists who intend to plunge the world into chaos.
 : The mysterious head, entirely draped in black. He creates the Egos Monster's inside the Egos heart, calling them "My beloved Children". They call him "Father". He is ultimately slain by the Lightning Sword Rocketter.
  (1–51): The high priest of Egos. He later becomes the Hedder Monster and is slain as such by the Battle Fever J's new attack, Battle Fever Power.
  (19–52): An Egos American branch officer who came to Japan to aid Hedder with her super strength. She is responsible for all the assassinations in America. She allowed herself to be captured by Battle Fever after attacking and replacing several policemen with disguised cutmen, with whom she stole a billion yen to give to Egos. She believes she is taken to the Battle Fever Base, but in reality she is taken to a warehouse. She carries a hand mirror with a tracker in it, which she uses to fire solar beams or to bludgeon people. She was killed in the collapsing castle as Satan Egos fled. Her last words were begging Egos to help her.
 : The foot soldiers in grey and black armed with MP40 machine guns.

Episodes

Movie
There was a theatrical release of Battle Fever J, released as part of the Toei Manga Matsuri on July 29, 1979. It was a blown up version of Episode 5 "Robot Big Dogfight". Interestingly though, this theatrical version did not appear on Toei's Super Sentai Movie compilation DVD's, but it did make its way onto Toei's Tokusatsu Hero The Movie DVD series, being featured on Volume 5 of that collection.

Cast
 Masao Den: 
 Kensaku Shiraishi: 
 Makoto Jin: 
 Kyosuke Shida: 
 Shiro Akebono: 
 Diane Martin: 
 Diane Martin (voice):  (Episodes 1-14 & 17-24) /  (Episodes 15 & 16)
 Maria Nagisa: 
 General Tetsuzan Kurama: 
 Keiko Nakahara: 
 Masaru Nakahara: 
 Tomoko Ueno: 
 Yuki Ueno: 
 Akio Hamamura: 
 Shigeo Aoki: 
 Kyutaro (voice): 
 Commander Hedder:  (Episodes 1, 3, 5 & 7) /  (Episodes 4, 6 & 8-51)
 Salome:  (Episodes 19-52)
 Satan Egos (voice): 
 Narrator:

Guest Stars

 Boiser Martin (Diane's father) (1 & 24): David Friedman
 Fake Diane Martin (Umbrella Monster's Human Form) (1)/Ayoko Ichijoji (52): Eri Kanuma
 Hikaru Amano (2): Maki Tachibana
 Miyoko Akiyama (2): Sumiko Kakizaki
 Hidemi (2): Ako Kami
 Editor In Chief Azuma / Death Mask Monster (3): Machiko Soga
 Member Of Scientific Journal (3): Kenzo Arai
 Bengal Tiger / Psychocinesis Monster (4): Masashi Ishibashi
 Sambo Segawa (4): Teiji Omiwa
 Sagaguchi Family (5)
 Director Sakaguchi: Nobuyuki Katsube
 Yoko Sakaguchi: Yukiko Ebina
 Kenichi Sakaguci: Yoichi Hirose
 Ken (6): Seiichi Ando
 Hideo Toyota (7): Minoru Takeuchi
 Nurse (7): Ritsuko Fujiyama
 Fireman (7): Satoshi Kurihara
 Policeman (7): Toshimichi Takahashi
 Dr. Yoneyama (8): Yoshikazu Sugi
 Koji Matsui (8): Kazuhito Ando
 Katayama Family (9)
 Shinichiro Katayama: Shun Domon
 Mitsuko Katayama: Junko Mihara
 Master Of Dealer Gun (9): Koji Sekiyama
 Teacher Moriyama (10): Kei Sunaga
 Teacher (11): Junko Asashina
 Xinyi Fukuda (11): Nobuyoshi Fukuda
 Junko Nogata / Rosalinka Monster (12): Mariko Jun
 Suzumoto Family (13)
 Yuzo Suzumoto: Masaya Taki
 Yaeko Suzumoto: Ai Komachi
 Yuichi Suzumoto: Masami Zaizen
 Yuichi's Sister: Tsuneko Kikuchi
 Rumi (13): Akemi Watanabe
 Yohei Oyama (14): Hiroshi Kusajiki
 Mizusawa Family (14)
 Kumiko Mizusawa: Rika Miura
 Miyoko Mizusawa: Michiyo Sato
 Cuttman (14): Hiro Kawarazaki
 Catherine (15): Tomomi Umeda
 Raita (15): Mirai Takeshi Sekiguchi
 Black Tiger Mari (16): Mitchi Love
 Mitsuru Okiyama (16): Naoya Uchida
 Black Snake (16): Jaguar Yokota (as Rimi Yokota)
 Hand-to-Hand Combat Monster : Kim Oomae
 Torishima Family (17)
 Daisuke Torishima/Dr. Taichi Torishima: Akira Oizumi
 Kuroda (17): Eiji Karasawa
 Racing Driver (17): Yojiro Terada
 Iwamoto Family (18)
 Director Iwamoto: Takashi Tabata
 Kazuki Iwamoto: Hajime Nakamura
 Grandmother Iwamoto: Toyoko Takechi
 Ryoko (20): Sayoko Tanimoto
 Spy Women's (21 & 22)
 Zero One: Yukie Kagawa
 Zero Two: Rie Mikawa
 Arishima Family (21 & 22)
 Senzo Arishima: Genji Kawai
 Shinobu Arishima: Kaoru Asakawa
 Old Woman (24): Keiko Orihara
 Catherine Martin (24): Louise Phillipe
 Sayuri Kurihara (25): Lisa Komaki
 Director (25): Gozo Soma
 Charmain Yumeno (25): Takeshi Yamamoto
 Yoshio Murano (32): Kenichi Endō
 Professor Mimura (33): Shiro Ooki
 Mayumi Mimura (33): Mika Matsushita
 Akira Jin (34): Toshiaki Kamohara
 Car Owner (34): Kin'ya Sugi
 Doutor Sekine/Hyde Monster (39): Shinji Todo
 Tsuyoshi Takeuchi (The Jackal) (43): Ryo Tomota
 Eye's Man (1944): Shinzo Tanabe
 Monshiro Ocho / Illusion Monster (44): Sumie Sakai

Songs
Opening theme
 
 Lyrics: 
 Composition and Arrangement: 
 Artist: MoJo with the Columbia Yurikago-Kai
 "Battle Fever J (Alternate Opening)"
 Lyrics: Keisuke Yamakawa
 Composition and Arrangement: Michiaki Watanabe
 Artist: MoJo, Columbia Yurikago-Kai, Feeling Free

Ending theme
 
 Lyrics: Saburō Yatsude
 Composition and Arrangement: Michiaki Watanabe
 Artist: MoJo

International broadcasts
Battle Fever J was popular in Hawaii, along with Gorenger, Kikaider, Kamen Rider V3, Rainbowman and many others, all of which were shown in the original Japanese dialogue and subtitled by JN Productions on then KIKU Channel 13. The show was also broadcast in Thailand late in the mid-1990s with the title Ranger J on MCOT Channel 9.

Notes

References

External links
 Official Battle Fever J website 

Super Sentai
1979 Japanese television series debuts
1980 Japanese television series endings
TV Asahi original programming
1970s Japanese television series
1980s Japanese television series
Television shows based on Marvel Comics
Fictional soldiers